Doug Considine (born 15 May 1957) is a Scottish former footballer. As a squad player he was a Scottish League winner at Aberdeen in 1980. A year later in 1981 he moved to Dunfermline Athletic in pursuit of first team football. Two seasons later he retired as a footballer aged 26.

Playing career

Doug Considine was born in Edinburgh in 1957. He joined Aberdeen from Highland League club Huntly in 1978 and spent three seasons at Pittodrie, where he was part of the team which won the Scottish Premier Division in 1980, playing fifteen times in the league that season.

He left Aberdeen in 1981 to join Dunfermline, where he remained until 1983, when he retired aged 26.

Honours

 Scottish Premier Division 1980

Personal life

Considine's son Andrew Considine currently plays for St Johnstone as a defender. His brother Iain Considine is a cofounder of the law firm Aberdein Considine.

Considine ran a dry cleaning business in Banchory following his retirement from football.

References

External links

1957 births
Living people
Footballers from Edinburgh
Scottish footballers
Aberdeen F.C. players
Dunfermline Athletic F.C. players
Scottish Football League players
Huntly F.C. players
Association football defenders